Darqadam (also Romanized as Dar Qadam; also known as Rowfekeh) is a village in Khavashod Rural District, Rud Ab District, Sabzevar County, Razavi Khorasan Province, Iran. At the 2006 census, its population was 374, in 101 families.

References 

Populated places in Sabzevar County